Baía Azul is a beach in the south of Benguela Province in Angola. It is situated south of Praia Morena beach. It owes its name to the blue waters that glisten from a light green to a navy blue. Baía Azul is considered "the mother" of the beaches in Benguela. Its unique and incomparable beauty and its sport fishing conditions make it a popular tourist attraction.

References

Benguela Province